Ronald Wright (born 1948) is a Canadian author.

Ronald Wright or Ron Wright may also refer to:

Ron Wright (baseball) (born 1976), American baseball player
Winky Wright (Ronald Lamont Wright, born 1971), American boxer
Ron Wright (umpire) (1913–1968), Australian cricket umpire
Ronald Wright (cricketer) (1903–1992), English cricketer
Ron Wright (footballer) (1929–2001), Australian rules footballer
Ron Wright (politician) (1953–2021), member of the United States House of Representatives
Ron Wright (wrestler) (1938–2015), American professional wrestler